Pinus densata, commonly known as the Sikang pine, is a species of conifer in the family Pinaceae.

It is endemic to – found only in – China.

References

densata
d
Endemic flora of China
Trees of Asia
Least concern plants
Taxonomy articles created by Polbot